Johann König (21 October 1586 – 4 March 1642) was a German painter. The son of a Nuremberg goldsmith, König was a follower of Adam Elsheimer. He is known today primarily because of his very finely painted copper panels.

Life
König was born in Nuremberg in 1586, the son of goldsmith Arnold König. His knowledge of the works of Johannes Rottenhammer of the elderly suggests that he might have spent his apprentice years in Augsburg (possibly with Rottenhammer).

What is certain is proving that he spent a year staying in Venice and in Rome from 1610 to 1614. Here he has possibly made contact in December 1610 with Adam Elsheimer before the later died. Elsheimers works directly stimulated Königs creativity. Even early works of König reflect Elsheimer landscape art.

Together with the works of Paul Bril they exerted a strong influence on the young painter. It was probably in Rome where he came into contact with the early works of Carlo Saraceni.

In 1614 he returned to Augsburg and married and also received the painter rights by the local gild. In 1622 he became a member of the painters' guild, a year later, he became a member of the Great Council. After 1620 he worked with Matthias Gundelach and Johann Matthias Kager together on the decorations of Augsburg Town Hall created by Elias Holl.

After Edict of Restitution followed on religious grounds by 1631 the return to Nuremberg, where he died after further work in March 1942.

Oeuvre

König was known as a painter of small-format images on copper and colorful miniatures and Kunstkammer pieces on marble. Philipp Hainhofer liked him very much and gave him time and again pedigree sheets etc. Orders. The amenities of the Augsburg Town Hall were with him the three monumental pictures of the room and the southwestern Prince courtroom commissioned.

Less well known is König for a series of large canvases with personifications of virtues and Roman rulers, which he painted for the Town Hall in Augsburg, and are now on display along with five drawings in the municipal art collections in the Schaezlerpalais in Augsburg. Other works of König are in Paris Louvre, in the Kunsthistorisches Museum in Vienna, the art gallery in Berlin, the Hessian State Museum in Darmstadt, the Staatliche Kunsthalle in Karlsruhe in National Museum of Germanic in Nuremberg and the Ashmolean Museum in Oxford.

This is followed by some unique pieces of medium-large format on canvas as the painting of Saint Peter, in the Herzog Anton Ulrich Museum in Braunschweig and the painting of the stoning of St. Stephen.

Literature
 Gode/Krämer. Augsburger Stadtlexikon (Stand: 2. Auflage Druckausgabe)
 Baumgartl/Lauterbach/Otto. Maler in Franken – Leben und Werk von Künstlern aus fünf Jahrhunderten, Nürnberg

References

17th-century German painters
Artists from Nuremberg
German male painters
1586 births
1642 deaths